The year 1876 in architecture involved some significant architectural events and new buildings.

Buildings and structures

Buildings opened
 February 2 – Church of St Mary the Virgin, Bury, England, designed by J. S. Crowther.
 August – The Bayreuth Festspielhaus, designed by Gottfried Semper.
 Hotel Sacher in Vienna, Austria.

Buildings completed

 R. and F. Cheney Building, Hartford, Connecticut, designed by Henry Hobson Richardson, considered to be "one of Richardson's greatest buildings"
 Great Zlatoust Church, Yekaterinburg, Russia, designed by Vasily Morgan.
 Government House, Melbourne, Australia, designed by William Wardell.
 Kaahumanu Church, Hawai'i, built by Rev Edward Bailey.
 Pennsylvania Academy of the Fine Arts, Philadelphia, designed by Frank Furness and George Hewitt.
 Swan House (Chelsea Embankment), London, designed by Richard Norman Shaw.
 Nádasdy Mansion, Nádasdladány, Hungary, designed by István Linzbauer and Alajos Hauszmann.
 The Midland Grand Hotel at St Pancras railway station in London, designed by George Gilbert Scott, is fully completed.

Awards
 RIBA Royal Gold Medal – Joseph-Louis Duc.
 Grand Prix de Rome, architecture: Paul Blondel.

Births
 March 27 – A. E. Lefcourt, born Abraham Elias Lefkowitz, English-born New York real estate developer (died 1932)
 May 18 – Thorvald Astrup, Norwegian industrial architect (died 1940)
 June 26 – Vincent Harris, English architect (died 1971)
 October 24 – Paul Philippe Cret, French-American architect and industrial designer (died 1945)
 November 24 – Walter Burley Griffin, American architect and landscape architect (died 1937)

Deaths
 May 7 – David Bryce, Scottish architect (b. 1803),
 August 21 – Ildefons Cerdà, Catalan Spanish urban planner (born 1815)
 date unknown – Jean-Baptiste Schacre, French architect (b. 1808)

References

Architecture
Years in architecture
19th-century architecture